Meshaal Aissa Barsham (born 14 February 1998) is a Qatari football player of Sudanese descent who plays as a goalkeeper for Al Sadd and for the Qatar national football team.

Club career

Al Sadd SC
On 27 August 2018, in the 2018 AFC Champions League quarter-finals, Barsham started for Al Sadd in their away game against Esteghlal. Al Sadd won the match 3–1.

Personal life
He is the younger brother of Olympic gold high jump medalist Mutaz Essa Barshim.

Honours

Club
Al-Sadd
Sheikh Jassim Cup: 2019
Qatari Stars Cup: 2019–2020
Emir of Qatar Cup: 2020, 2021
Qatar Cup: 2020, 2021
Qatar Stars League: 2018–2019, 2020–2021, 2021-22

External links
Profile on www.al-saddclub.com

References

1998 births
Living people
Qatari footballers
Al Sadd SC players
Sudanese emigrants to Qatar
Naturalised citizens of Qatar
Association football goalkeepers
Qatar Stars League players
Qatar youth international footballers
2021 CONCACAF Gold Cup players
2022 FIFA World Cup players